Elachista totanaensis is a moth of the family Elachistidae that is endemic to Spain.

References

totanaensis
Moths described in 1992
Moths of Europe
Endemic fauna of Spain